Movietone is an English post-rock band. They formed in Bristol, England in 1994.  Core members are Kate Wright and Rachel Brook, with Wright being the main songwriter.

Kate Wright is also in the band 1000 dawns and is currently the bass player for Crescent. Rachel Brook was a member of Flying Saucer Attack during the first few years of the band's existence. Matt Jones (Crescent) has been the drummer since the start and recorded and mixed many of the songs. 
Other musicians have included:  Matt Elliott (The Third Eye Foundation), Ros Walford, Florence Lovegrove, Sam Jones (Balky Mule, Crescent), Chris Cole (Many Fingers), Tom Cops (My Two Toms), Michal William (Headfall), Lisa Brook (Headfall), George McKenzie (Headfall, Motes, Vase), John Coe and Clare Ring.

Movietone recorded three John Peel Sessions at Maida Vale Studios on 12/05/1994, 28/01/1996 and 31/08/1997.

2003's The Sand and The Stars was partly recorded live on a bay near Land's End.

Kate Wright features on Appendix Out's 'Daylight Saving' (Drag City, 1999) and (with Matt Jones) on Headfall's 'Stars Don't Shine to Noise' (Spazoom/Little Waves, 2003) and My Two Tom's 'Who We Were And What We Meant By It' (Stitch-Stitch, 2010).

Before Movietone, Matt Elliott, Kate Wright and Rachel Brook formed the band Lynda's Strange Vacation.

Rachel Brook did a 7 inch record under the name 'From Red Down', (Acetone, 1999).

Movietone is featured on the soundtrack to the film Hallam Foe.

Discography

Albums
 Movietone, Planet Records, 1995 (Re-issued on Geographic, 2003)
 Day and Night, Drag City and Domino, 1997
 The Blossom Filled Streets, Drag City and Domino, 2000
 The Sand and The Stars, Drag City and Domino, 2003
 Peel Sessions 1994–1997, Textile, 2022

Singles (All 7" vinyl and Flexi Disc only)
 "She Smiled Mandarine Like" /  "Orange Zero" (Planet, 1994)
 "Mono Valley" / "Under the 3000 Foot Red Ceiling" (Planet, 1995)
 "Useless Landscape" / "Summer" (Planet, 1997)
 "Sun Drawing" / "Marine Oceano" (Domino, 1997)
 "Noche Marina" / "Night of the Acacias" live at the Cube Cinema, May 1, 1999 (Archipeligo-Disc/Little Waves/Movietone 2004)
 "Porthcurno live at the Knitting Factory, New York, 2000", Ltd Edition 7 inch Flexi Disc (radio/ON 2020)

Track listing and credits:

''Movietone, Planet Records, 1995 (Re-issued on Geographic, 2003)Chance is her Opera: Kate Wright -words/vocals/guitar, Rachel Brook -bass, Matt Elliott -guitar, Matt Jones -drumsHeatwave Pavement: Kate Wright -words/vocals, Rachel Brook -bass, Matt Elliott -guitar, Matt Jones -drums, Ros Walford -clarinetGreen Ray: Rachel Brook -words/vocals/guitar, Clare Ring -double bassOrange Zero: Kate Wright -words/vocals/guitar, Rachel Brook -bass, Matt Elliott -guitar, Matt Jones -drums, Ros Walford -clarinetLate July: Kate Wright -words/vocals/guitar, Rachel Brook -guitarDarkness-Blue Glow: Kate Wright -words/vocals/guitar, Matt Elliott -piano, Matt Jones - drumsMono Valley: Kate Wright -words/vocals/guitar, Rachel Brook -bass, Matt Elliott -guitar/smashing glass, Matt Jones -drums
 Coastal Lagoon: Kate Wright -words/vocals/guitar, Rachel Brook -bass, Matt Jones -drumsAlkaline Eye: Kate Wright - words/vocals/guitar/harmonium, Rachel Brook -bass3AM Walking, Smoking, Talking: Kate Wright -words/vocals/guitar, Matt Elliott -guitar, Matt Jones -drums, Clare Ring -double bass3 Fires: Kate Wright -words/vocals/guitar, Matt Elliott -lighterSleeve Design: Kate WrightOrange Zero Single, (reissue/Geographic 2003):Kate Wright -words/vocals/guitar, Rachel Brook -bass/clarinet, Matt Jones -drumsChance Is Her Opera Demo (reissue/Geographic 2003): Kate Wright -words/vocals/guitar Pete Brazier -bongosUnder the 3000 ft Red Ceiling single (reissue/Geographic 2003): Kate Wright -guitar, Rachel Brook -Bass, Matt Elliott -guitar, Matt Jones -drums, Ros Walford -clarinet"She Smiled Mandarine Like" /  "Orange Zero" (Planet Records, 1994)She Smiled Mandarine Like: Kate Wright -words/vocals/guitar/harmonium, Rachel Brook, bass/vocals, Matt Jones -drumsOrange Zero:Kate Wright -words/vocals/guitar, Rachel Brook -bass/clarinet, Matt Jones -drumsRecord sleeve Design: Kate Wright"Mono Valley" / "Under the 3000 Foot Red Ceiling" (Planet Records, 1995)Mono Valley: Kate Wright -words/vocals/guitar, Rachel Brook -bass, Matt Elliott -guitar/smashing glass, Matt Jones -drums, Ros Walford -clarinetUnder the 3000 ft Red Ceiling: Kate Wright -guitar, Rachel Brook -Bass, Matt Elliott -guitar, Matt Jones -drums, Ros Walford -clarinetRecord Sleeve Design: Kate Wright/Matt JonesDay and Night, Drag City and Domino, 1997Sun Drawing: Kate Wright -words/vocals/acoustic guitar/piano, Rachel Brook -Bass, Matt Elliott -guitar, Matt Jones -drumsBlank Like Snow: Kate Wright -words/vocals/guitarUseless Landscape: Kate Wright -words/vocals/acoustic guitar, Rachel Brook -bass, Matt Elliott -guitar, Matt Jones -drums, Ros Walford -clarinetsummer: Kate Wright -words/vocals/piano, Rachel Brook -bass, Matt Elliott -guitar, Matt Jones -drums, Florence Lovegrove -ViolaNight Of The Acacias: Kate Wright -bass, Rachel Brook -xylophone, Matt Elliott -guitar/noises, Matt Jones -drums, Ros Walford -clarinet, Florence Lovegrove -pianoNoche Marina: Kate Wright - words/vocals/acoustic guitar, Rachel Brook -pianoCrystallisation Of Salt At Night: Kate Wright -words/vocals/guitar, Rachel Brook -bass, Matt Elliott -guitar, Matt Jones -drumsSleeve Design: Kate Wright

'"Useless Landscape" / "Summer" 7 inch (Planet, 1997)

Useless Landscape: Kate Wright - words/vocals/acoustic guitar, Rachel Brook - bass, Matt Elliott - guitar, Matt Jones - drums, Ros walford - clarinet

summer: Kate Wright -words/vocals/piano, Matt Elliott -guitar, Matt Jones -drums

Record Sleeve Design: Kate Wright

"Sun Drawing" / "Marine Oceano" 7 inch (Domino, 1997)

Sun Drawing: Kate Wright -words/vocals/acoustic guitar/piano, Rachel Brook -Bass, Matt Elliott -guitar, Matt Jones -drums

Marine Oceano: Kate Wright -guitar, Rachel brook -piano, Florence Lovegrove -viola

Record Sleeve Design: Kate Wright

The Blossom Filled Streets, Domino Records and Drag City, 2000

Hydra: Kate Wright -words/vocals/bass, Rachel Brook -clarinet, Matt Jones -drums, Sam Jones -guitar, Florence Lovegrove -viola, Chris Cole

Star Ruby: Kate Wright -words/vocals/guitar/piano, Rachel Brook -piano

1930's Beach House: Kate Wright -words/vocals/guitar/piano, Rachel Brook -bass, Matt Jones -drums, Sam Jones -guitar, Florence Lovegrove -viola, Chris Cole -piano

Year Ending: Kate Wright -acoustic guitar, Rachel Brook -clarinet, Matt Jones -cymbals/fender rhodes, Sam Jones -guitar, Chris Cole -guicello

The blossom Filled Streets: Kate Wright -words/vocals/piano, Rachel Brook -bass, Matt Jones -drums, Sam Jones -guitar, Florence Lovegrove -viola

Porthcurno: kate Wright -words/vocals/piano

Seagulls/Bass: Kate Wright -bass

In a Marine Light: Kate Wright -piano, Rachel Brook -clarinet, Matt Jones -drums, Sam Jones -cubist bass

Night In These Rooms: Kate Wright -words/vocals/backing vocals/guitar, Rachel Brook -clarinet/backing vocals, Matt Jones -double bass/backing vocals

Sleeve Design: the vinyl and CD version of 'The Blossom Filled Streets' had different covers and inserts, but the same back cover.  Front cover of LP/CD - Kate Wright, LP centre labels/red print on back cover - Rachel Brook, Domino and Drag City Logos - Matt Jones.

Movietone The Sand And The Stars, Domino Records and Drag City 2003

The Sand and The Stars: Kate Wright -words/vocals/ acoustic guitar, Matt Jones -electric guitar, Tom cops -piano

Ocean Song: Kate Wright -vocals/electric guitar, Rachel Coe -bass, Matt Jones -drums, Sam Jones -guitar, Chris Cole -fender rhodes/trumpet, Tom Cops -banjo, George McKenzie -tenor saxophone

In Mexico: Kate Wright -words/vocals acoustic guitar, Rachel Coe - words/vocals/steel strung guitar, Matt Jones -banjo, Sam Jones -drums, Chris Cole -cello/double bass

Pale Tracks: Kate Wright -cello/vocals, Rachel Coe -piano/vocals, Matt Jones -drums/vocals, Sam Jones -words/vocals/wine glasses, Chris Cole -accordion/wine glasses

Let Night In: Rachel Coe -words/vocals/piano/clarinet, John Coe -words/guitar

We Rode On: Kate Wright -words/vocals/acoustic guitar, Rachel Coe -clarinet, Matt jones -words, Sam Jones -guitar, Chris Cole -cello, Tom Cops -banjo, Michal Davies -trumpet, Lisa Brook -clarinet, George Mckenzie -bass saxophone

Not Even Close: Kate Wright -acoustic guitar, Rachel Coe -organ, Matt Jones -drums, Sam Jones -electric guitar

Red earth: Kate Wright -words/vocals/cello, Matt Jones -words/vocals/drums/organ, Sam Jones -guitar, Tom Cops -banjo, George McKenzie -tenor saxophone

Beach Samba: Kate Wright -words/vocals/double bass, Rachel Coe -clarinet, Matt Jones -words/drums, Sam Jones -guitar, Tom Cops -banjo, John Coe -guitar, Lisa Brook -clarinet, Michal Davies -trumpet, George McKenzie -tenor saxophone

Near Marconi's Hut: Kate Wright -words/vocals/guitar

Sleeve Design : Kate Wright, layout by John Coe, Photographs by Tom Cops and Michal Davies

Porthcurno, Live at the Knitting Factory, New York, 2000, 7 inch Flexi Disc (radio/ON, 2020)Porthcurno: Kate Wright  -words/vocals/pianoSleeve Design''' - Michal Davies

References

External links

 

Musical groups from Bristol
English post-rock groups
Drag City (record label) artists
Musical groups established in 1994